Roswitha Lopez (born 13 November 1969) is a former synchronized swimmer from Aruba. She competed in the women's solo and women's duet at the 1988 Summer Olympics.

References 

1969 births
Living people
Aruban synchronized swimmers
Olympic synchronized swimmers of Aruba
Synchronized swimmers at the 1988 Summer Olympics